Eunoe is a genus of marine annelids in the family Polynoidae (scale worms).  The genus includes 48 species which are found world-wide, mostly from depths of 50 m or more.

Description 
Body dorsoventrally flattened, short, with up to 50 segments; dorsum more or less covered by elytra or short posterior region uncovered. Fifteen pairs of elytra on segments 2, 4, 5, 7, 9, 11, 13, 15, 17, 19, 21, 23, 26, 29, and 32. Prostomium with or without distinct cephalic peaks and three antennae; lateral antennae inserted ventrally to median antenna. Anterior pair of eyes dorsolateral at widest part of prostomium, posterior pair dorsal near hind margin. Parapodia with elongate acicular lobes with both acicula penetrating epidermis; neuropodia with a supra-acicular process. Notochaetae stout with distinct rows of spines and blunt tip. Neurochaetae more numerous and more slender, with distinct rows of spines distally and exclusively unidentate tips.

The genus was described in 1865, with a modern redescription in Barnich & Fiege (2010).  Eunoe is one of a number of related genera with 15 pairs of elytra.

Species 
The following species of Eunoe were accepted as valid as of October 2019:

 Eunoe abyssorum McIntosh, 1885
 Eunoe alvinella Pettibone, 1989
 Eunoe anderssoni (Bergström, 1916)
 Eunoe assimilis McIntosh, 1924
 Eunoe barbata Moore, 1910
 Eunoe bathydomus (Ditlevsen, 1917)
 Eunoe brunnea Hartman, 1978
 Eunoe campbellica Averincev, 1978
 Eunoe clarki Pettibone, 1951
 Eunoe crassa (Treadwell, 1924)
 Eunoe depressa Moore, 1905
 Eunoe etheridgei (Benham, 1915)
 Eunoe eura Chamberlin, 1919
 Eunoe hartmanae (Uschakov, 1962)
 Eunoe hozawai Okuda, 1939
 Eunoe hubrechti (McIntosh, 1900)
 Eunoe hydroidopapillata Rzhavsky & Shabad, 1999
 Eunoe iphionoides McIntosh, 1885
 Eunoe ivantsovi Averincev, 1978
 Eunoe kermadeca Kirkegaard, 1995
 Eunoe laetmogonensis Kirkegaard & Billett, 1980
 Eunoe leiotentaculata Averincev, 1978
 Eunoe macrophthalma McIntosh, 1924
 Eunoe mammiloba Czerniavsky, 1882
 Eunoe nodosa (M. Sars, 1861)
 Eunoe nodulosa Day, 1967
 Eunoe oerstedi Malmgren, 1865
 Eunoe opalina McIntosh, 1885
 Eunoe pallida (Ehlers, 1908)
 Eunoe papillaris Averincev, 1978
 Eunoe papillosa Amaral & Nonato, 1982
 Eunoe purpurea Treadwell, 1936
 Eunoe rhizoicola Hartmann-Schröder, 1962
 Eunoe senta (Moore, 1902)
 Eunoe sentiformis Uschakov, 1958
 Eunoe serrata Amaral & Nonato, 1982
 Eunoe shirikishinai Imajima & Hartman, 1964
 Eunoe spinicirris Annenkova, 1937
 Eunoe spinosa Imajima, 1997
 Eunoe spinulosa Verrill, 1879
 Eunoe subfumida (Grube, 1878)
 Eunoe subtruncata Annenkova, 1937
 Eunoe tritoni McIntosh, 1900
 Eunoe tuerkayi Barnich & Fiege, 2003
 Eunoe uniseriata Banse & Hobson, 1968
 Eunoe yedoensis McIntosh, 1885

References 

Phyllodocida
Polychaete genera
Bioluminescent annelids